Braley is a surname. Notable people with the surname include:

Berton Braley (1882–1966), American poet
Bruce Braley (born 1957), the Democratic Congressman for Iowa's first Congressional District
Callum Braley (born 1994), English rugby union player
David Braley (1941–2020), Canadian sports tycoon and senator
Scott Braley (born 1947), leftist activist and regional organizer for the Michigan State University's chapter of the SDS

See also
Braley, Missouri, a community in the United States
David Braley Athletic Centre, new sports venue at McMaster University in Hamilton, Ontario, which opened up in 2007